Broadway is an east-west street in San Francisco that runs from The Embarcadero to the Pacific Heights neighborhood. The neon-lined stretch of Broadway through North Beach was historically the city's red-light district, home to strip clubs and other adult businesses, as well as many nightclubs and bars, and has been featured in several films and television shows. The street is home to several notable venues, such as the Showgirls theater, Convent of the Sacred Heart High School, and the City Lights Bookstore. West of the Broadway Tunnel, Broadway becomes more and more residential, moving from multiple dwelling units into two of the City's wealthier neighborhoods, Cow Hollow and Pacific Heights. It ends at Lyon Street and the Presidio which is gated to vehicular traffic.

References

External links

Chinatown, San Francisco
North Beach, San Francisco
Red-light districts in California
Sex industry in San Francisco
Streets in San Francisco